Kaori Ekuni (江國 香織 Ekuni Kaori, born 21 March 1964) is a Japanese author. She was born in Setagaya, Tokyo. Her father is Japanese haiku poet and essayist, Shigeru Ekuni.

Works
In Japan, she was dubbed the female Murakami. Her numerous works of fiction have been translated into several languages and published in many different countries, including her novel Twinkle Twinkle, which has been translated into English.

From 2004 to 2008 her books were continuously in Korea's top 50 bestsellers list. Twinkle Twinkle was a bestseller in 1991.

Awards
 Murasaki Shikibu Prize, 1992,  Kirakira Hikaru 
 Yamamoto Shūgorō Prize, 2001, It's not safe or suitable to swim
 Naoki Prize, 2004 Gokyu suru Junbi wa Dekiteita

See also
Japanese Literature

Works

Selected works in English
 "Girl Friends", trans. Sharni Wilson, Lunch Ticket, 2020
 "Night, wife, detergent", trans. Sharni Wilson, Asymptote, 2020

References

External links
 Kaori Ekuni at J'Lit Books from Japan 
 Synopsis of God's Boat (Kamisama no boto) at JLPP (Japanese Literature Publishing Project) 

1964 births
People from Setagaya
Living people
Japanese writers
Naoki Prize winners